Protambulyx eurycles is a species of moth of the family Sphingidae first described by Gottlieb August Wilhelm Herrich-Schäffer in 1854.

Distribution 
It is known from Suriname, Guyana, French Guiana, Colombia, Ecuador, Peru, Bolivia, Brazil, Costa Rica, Nicaragua and Mexico.

Description 
It is similar to Protambulyx euryalus but the forewing marginal band is much broader and the proximal edge is crenulated. Females are less heavily marked than males.

References

Protambulyx
Sphingidae of South America
Moths described in 1854
Moths of South America